The Șoimul is a right tributary of the Poclușa in Romania. It flows into the Poclușa near Șoimi.

References

Rivers of Romania
Rivers of Bihor County